Antonio Tavira y Almazán, (Iznatoraf, province of Jaen, 30 September 1737  - Salamanca, January 1807). A member of the Royal Spanish Academy from 1775 to 1807. Famous archeologist who found visigothic remains, near Cabezo del Griego, described since then as Segobriga. He had some clashes with the Spanish Inquisition, related to the regalist wishes of King Carlos IV of Spain to give to the bishop's jurisdiction on the annulment of marriages, he was also the Honorary Chaplain of King Charles III of Spain since 1772, aged 36. A Knight and a Prior of the Military Order of Santiago in Uclés, province of Cuenca,  (1788–1789), Bishop of Canarias, (1791–1796), Bishop of Osma, (1796–1798), Bishop of Salamanca, (1798–1807).

He was a very close friend of Minister Gaspar Melchor de Jovellanos, suspicious of the Spanish Inquisitors at the end of the 18th century whom he suspected of incompetence and connivence with the French regalist, "constitutionalist" and "bonapartist" Bishop Henry Grégoire, Abbé Grégoire, (Vého, (Trois-Évêchés), near Lunéville, France, 4 December 1750 - Paris, 20 May 1831).

He was ordained a bishop of Salamanca, (perhaps), Catholic Bishop of Maximionopolis, Palestine, by the Scottish Priest Alexander Cameron, ( Braemar, Aberdeenshire, 28 July 1747 - Bishop of Maximionopolis, Palestine by Tavira 28 October 1798- Vicar Apostolic of Lowland District, around Edinburgh, Scotland, Great Britain, 24 August 1805 - 20 August 1825 Retired - died 7 February 1828, aged 80).

References
El Museo Virtual de Segobriga (Virtual Museum of Segobriga, first researches by Antonio Tavira, 1788–1789):
 https://web.archive.org/web/20080914065804/http://www.segobrigavirtual.es/

1737 births
1807 deaths
18th-century Spanish archaeologists
Bishops of Osma
Bishops of Salamanca
Members of the Royal Spanish Academy
University of Salamanca alumni
Academic staff of the University of Salamanca